The Voice of Youth (tVoY) is a youth network spread across 151 countries.

History
tVoY was initiated by a student of National University of Sciences and Technology, Pakistan (NUST) in June, 2010 basically to cultivate relations with youth belonging to different strata of life. But behind this obvious reason, there lies a deeper visionary objective – that is to create a forum where the youth of Pakistan could mingle and enrich one other by their perceptions and views.

Social media as an alternate form of media has brought the conflict zones of the world into limelight. With the vision of a peaceful society, one of the goals of tVoY is also to speak to millions about resolution of conflicts, their nature and root causes.

Considering the swift spread of the concept of e-Journalism and online access to information, tVoY ultimately aims to connect all the actors of communication ecosystem through the use of digital technology and by granting the right to express heterogeneous views for homogeneity.

Mission
To cultivate relations with youth belonging to different strata of life, providing all with a platform to freely pursue their individuality for collective progression.

Goals
• Lend youth a voice to express their ideas, opinions and aspirations for themselves and their community
• Help groom youth’s perspective by presenting many views on popular social issues, thus garnering acceptance, tolerance and broad-mindedness in them
• Highlight youth voices from conflict zones
• Electronically preserve Urdu and regional languages for future generations
• Connect young people all around the world

Blog
tVoY started out as blog for NUSTians on June 26, 2010. It later expanded for the student community at large in August, 2010.

Only tVoY's official representatives can post at the blog.

Network
tVoY has a core team of 11 young talents. It also has approximately 1000 representatives from about 75 educational institutes of Pakistan. The first batch of interns was recruited in August 2011.

Acclaim
tVoY has received critical acclaim from many Pakistani newspapers, journals and online publications. Prominent among them are Pakistan Observer, The Nation, The News and Dawn.

Partners
tVoY has partnered with many national and international youth-led events, organizations and societies.

References

External links 
 the Voice of Youth on Facebook

Mass media in Pakistan
Youth-led media